Horta premetro station is a stop on the Brussels Metro. It is located on the north–south Brussels premetro line in the Saint-Gilles commune of the Brussels capital region, Belgium. It was opened on 3 December 1993.

Location

The premetro station forms part of a southerly extension to the north–south Brussels premetro line (formerly line 3), which originally linked the Brussels-North railway station and Brussels-South railway station. Located on the Chaussée de Waterloo/Waterloosesteenweg, the underground station serves the 3, 4, 33 and 51 trams while the 81, 83 and 97 trams and 48 bus stop 100 m to the north-west around the Barrière de Saint-Gilles.

An underground car park occupies the space between the platforms and the park above. The station is unusual in that it can only be reached from the eastern end, at the entrance on the Chaussée de Waterloo/Waterloosesteenweg, whereas no entrance was built leading to Place van Meenen/Van Meenenplein, which would have eased access to the town hall.

Decoration

The station is named for Art Nouveau architect Victor Horta, who designed a number of significant buildings in the area. Decorative ironwork and stained glass designed by Horta for the Maison du Peuple/Volkshuis and Hôtel Aubecq, which were demolished in the 1950s and 1960s, is on display in the station.

The interior tilework is grey. The station is a favourite hangout for adolescents, and the STIB/MIVB security officers, community wardens and police are often in attendance. On 22 January 2012, the station suffered a graffiti attack of such scale - paint had been splashed carelessly all the way along the walls - that it was closed for 24 hours while it was cleaned.

External links 

 Photographs of Horta station
 Map showing surrounds of station

Brussels metro stations
Saint-Gilles, Belgium